Miss República Dominicana 2015 was held on August 30, 2015 in the Renaissance Auditorio de Festival del Hotel Jaragua, Santo Domingo Dominican Republic. The winner represented the Dominican Republic in Miss Universe 2015. The First Runner-up or Miss Hispanoamericana Dominican Republic entered Reina Hispanoamericana 2015. The Second Runner-up or Miss United Continents Dominican Republic entered Miss United Continent 2016.

Results

National Costume Competition

Contestants

References

External links
Official website

Miss Dominican Republic
Dominican Republic